Margaretha is the standard Dutch form of the feminine given name Margaret as well as a common form of it in Sweden. In daily life, many use a short form, like Gré, Greet, Greta, Grietje, Marga, Margo, Margot, Margreet, Margriet, and Meta. People with the name include:

Margaretha von Bahr (1921—2016), Finnish ballerina and choreographer
Margaretha van Bancken (1628–1694), Dutch publisher
Margaretha Cornelia Boellaard (1795–1872), Dutch painter, lithographer and art collector
Margaretha "Margreeth" de Boer (born 1939), Dutch government minister
Margaretha Byström (born 1937), Swedish actress, writer and director
Margaretha Coppier (1516–1597), Dutch noble and a heroine of the Dutch war of liberation
Margaretha Donner (1726–1774), Swedish business person
Margaretha Dros-Canters (1900–1934), Dutch hockey, badminton- and tennis player
Margaretha Brita "Greta" Duréel (died 1696), Swedish noble bank fraudster
Margaretha Flesch (1826–1906), Beatified German Franciscan nun
Margaretha E.C. "Caroline" de Fouw (born 1966), Dutch cricketer
Margaretha Cornelia "Greetje" Gaillard (born 1926), Dutch swimmer
Margaretha van Godewijk (1627–1677), Dutch poet and flower still life painter
Margaretha H.M. Groeneveld (born 1956), Dutch singer and television presenter known as Marcha or Marga bult
Margaretha Guidone (born 1956), Dutch-Belgian environmentalist
Margaretha Haverman (1693–aft.1739), Dutch flower still life painter
Margaretha de Heer (1603–1665), Dutch genre and animal painter
Margaretha Heijkenskjöld (1781–1834), Swedish traveler and a dress reformer
Margaretha Hofmans (1894–1968), Dutch faith healer and confidante of Queen Juliana
Margaretha van Holland (1311–1356), Countess of Holland and Hainaut
Margaretha "Greta" Keller  (1903–1977), Austrian-American cabaret singer and actress
Margaretha Kirch (c.1703–aft.1744), German astronomer
Margaretha A.M. "Marga" Klompé (1912–1986), Dutch government minister
Margaretha Krook (1925–2001), Swedish stage and film actress
Margaretha Leenmans (1909–1998), Dutch poet and psychiatrist better known as M. Vasalis
Margaretha Lind (born 1942), Jordanian princess
Margaretha Lindahl (born 1974), Swedish curler
Margaretha Loewensberg (born 1943), Swiss architect
Margaretha Antonia Marie Félicité of Luxembourg (born 1957), Princess of Luxembourg and Liechtenstein
Margaretha van Mechelen (c.15801662), Mistress of Maurice of Nassau, Prince of Orange
Margaretha M.A. "Margriet" de Moor (born 1941), Dutch pianist and writer of novels and essays
Margaretha van Norden (1911–1963), Dutch swimmer
Margaretha van Parma (1522–1586), Flemish Governor of the Habsburg Netherlands from 1559 to 1567
Margaretha "Marga" van Praag (born 1946), Dutch journalist and television presenter
Margaretha Reichardt (1907–1984), German textile artist, weaver, and graphic designer
Margaretha Roosenboom (1843–1896), Dutch flower still life painter
Margaretha Alexandrine von Rothschild (1855–1905), daughter of Baron Mayer Carl von Rothschild
Barbara Margaretha "Meta" von Salis  (1855–1929), Swiss feminist and historian
Margaretha Sandra (1629–1674), Dutch Franco-Dutch War heroine
Margaretha Seuerling (1747–1820), Swedish actress and theatre director
Margaretha Sigfridsson (born 1976), Swedish curler
Margaretha C.A. "Margreeth" Smilde (born 1954), Dutch CDA politician
Margaretha E. "Margriet" Tindemans (1951–2014), Dutch musician, specializing in medieval music
Margaretha Maria "Gretha" Tromp (born 1964), Dutch sprinter and hurdler
Margaretha af Ugglas (born 1939), Swedish government minister
Margaretha van Valckenburch (1565–1650), Dutch shipowner, only female stockholder of the Dutch East India Company
Margaretha von Waldeck (1533–1554), German noble, possible inspiration for Snow White 
Margaretha Wulfraet (1678–1760), Dutch painter
Margaretha Geertruida "Grietje" Zelle (1876–1917), Dutch exotic dancer and courtesan executed by France (Mata Hari)
Margaretha Zetterberg (1733–1893), Finnish textile and handcrafts worker

See also
Johan & Margaretha, sometimes also just "Margaretha", a resort in Suriname
Margareta, another spelling used Sweden and elsewhere
Margarethe, a German version of the name

Dutch feminine given names
Given names derived from gemstones
Swedish feminine given names

nl:Margaretha